Jacques Poitrenaud (born 22 May 1922, Lille – died 5 April 2005, Paris) was a French film director and actor.

Director
1956: Saint-Germain-en-Laye, cité royale (Short)
1957: Enfants, Touraine (Short)
1960: La revenante (Short)
1960: Les portes claquent (co-réalisé avec Michel Fermaud)
1961: Les Amours de Paris
1962: Les Parisiennes (pour le sketch : Ella)
1963: Strip Tease (Sweet Skin, 1965 U.S. release title)
1963: L'Inconnue de Hong Kong
1964: Du grabuge chez les veuves
1964: Une souris chez les hommes (or Un drôle de caïd)
1965: 
1966: Four Queens for an Ace (French title: Carré de dames pour un as)
1967: 
1968: Ce sacré grand-père (English title: The Marriage Came Tumbling Down)
1969: 
1971: Mendiants et orgueilleux (according to the novel of Albert Cossery)

Actor 
In cinema
1981: Birgitt Haas Must Be Killed (of Laurent Heynemann)
1982: Qu'est-ce qu'on attend pour être heureux! (of Coline Serreau) - Le directeur de production
1984: Un dimanche à la campagne (of Bertrand Tavernier) - Hector 
1985: Trois hommes et un couffin (of Coline Serreau) - Le premier flic
1985: Cinématon n° 619 (of Gérard Courant)
1986: Autour de minuit (Round Midnight) (of Bertrand Tavernier)
1987: Les mois d'avril sont meurtriers (of Laurent Heynemann) - Le patron du bistrot
1989: Romuald et Juliette (of Coline Serreau) - Fonctionnaire 1
1996: La Belle Verte (of Coline Serreau) - Un passant
2001: Chaos (of Coline Serreau) - Le collègue de Paul #2 (final film role)

 In TV
1990: Six Crimes sans assassins (of Bernard Stora) - Le commissaire du 12ème

References

External links 
 

French film directors
French male film actors
1922 births
2005 deaths
Mass media people from Lille
French male television actors